The 2014 Inter-Provincial Trophy is the second season of the Inter-Provincial Trophy, the domestic Twenty20 cricket competition of Ireland. The competition is played between Leinster Lightning, Northern Knights and North-West Warriors.

The North-West Warriors won the 2014 competition, winning by three points from Leinster Lightning. The final days matches, scheduled for Pembroke CC in Dublin, were abandoned due to bad weather, meaning that the Warriors maintained their lead at the top of the table.

The player of the tournament was David Rankin of the North-West Warriors.

The Inter-Provincial Series has been funded at least partly by the ICC via their TAPP programme.

Table

The points system has changed for 2014, with 4 points now awarded for a win, 2 points for a tie or no result, and 1 bonus point available to a team winning a match with a run rate of 1.25 times that of the losing team.

Squads

Fixtures

See also
2014 Inter-Provincial Championship
2014 Inter-Provincial Cup
2014 Irish cricket season

References

Inter
Inter-Provincial Trophy seasons